Dorsett Hospitality International, formerly known as Kosmopolito Hotels International, is an international hotel and hospitality organization. Established in 2007, the company is a subsidiary of Far East Consortium International Limited. The company develops, owns and manages hotels across several countries with a specific focus in the Asia Pacific region.. Previously listed on the Hong Kong Stock Exchange in October 2010, Dorsett Hospitality International was privatised by its parent company Far East Consortium Limited in 2015.  The president and CEO of the organisation is Chiu Wing Kwan "Winnie", and the Chief Operating Officer is Lai Wai Keung.

Hotels

Hotels can be found throughout Hong Kong, Malaysia (Kuala Lumpur, Johor Bahru, Labuan and Subang), China (Shanghai, Chengdu, Jiujiang and Wuhan), Singapore and the United Kingdom (London).

List of hotels as of September 2017:
Hong Kong
 Dorsett Kwun Tong, Hong Kong
 Dorsett Mongkok, Hong Kong
 Dorsett Tsuen Wan, Hong Kong
 Lan Kwai Fong Hotel@Kau U Fong
 Silka Far East, Hong Kong
 Silka Seaview, Hong Kong
 Silka West Kowloon, Hong Kong
 Silka Tsuen Wan, Hong Kong
 Cosmo Hotel Hong Kong
 Dorsett Wanchai Hong Kong Hotel

Mainland China
 Dorsett Grand Chengdu
 Dorsett Shanghai
 Dorsett Wuhan
 Lushan Resort

Singapore
 Dorsett Singapore

United Kingdom
 Dorsett Shepherds Bush, London
 Dorsett City London

Malaysia
 Dorsett Grand Labuan
 Dorsett Grand Subang
 Dorsett Kuala Lumpur
 Silka Johor Bahru
 Silka Maytower, Kuala Lumpur
 Silka Cheras
 Dorsett Putrajaya
 Dorsett Hartamas Kuala Lumpur

References

Companies listed on the Hong Kong Stock Exchange
Hospitality companies of Hong Kong
Land developers of Hong Kong
Hong Kong brands
Hotel chains
Hotels in Hong Kong
Hotels in Malaysia
Hotels in Singapore
Hotels in London
Hotels in Shanghai